The nasute finesnout ctenotus (Ctenotus nasutus)  is a species of skink found in Northern Territory and Western Australia.

References

nasutus
Reptiles described in 1969
Taxa named by Glen Milton Storr